Harold Dawson (10 August 1914 – 14 May 1994) was an English first-class cricketer. Dawson was a right-handed batsman who bowled right-arm medium pace.

Dawson joined famous Lancashire League team Todmorden Cricket Club in 1931. A prolific batsman for the club, Dawson scored a fifty on every ground in the Lancashire League. Dawson played in four championship and four Worsley Cup-winning sides.

Dawson represented Hampshire in ten first-class matches between 1937 and 1938. Dawson made his County Championship debut against Kent in 1937. His final first-class appearance for the county came against a Combined Services team in 1938.

In 1949 Dawson represented Devon in a friendly match against Worcestershire. In 1957 Dawson was part of a combined Lancashire League side that took on Lancashire in a friendly match.

From 1985 to 1986 Dawson was the president of Todmorden Cricket Club and of the Lancashire League.

Dawson died in Todmorden, Yorkshire on 14 May 1994.

External links
Harold Dawson at Cricinfo
Harold Dawson at CricketArchive
Matches and detailed statistics for Harold Dawson

1914 births
1994 deaths
People from Todmorden
English cricketers
Hampshire cricketers
Devon cricketers
English cricket administrators
Sportspeople from Yorkshire